The 2011 Trophée Éric Bompard was the fifth event of six in the 2011–12 ISU Grand Prix of Figure Skating, a senior-level international invitational competition series. It was held at the Palais Omnisports de Paris-Bercy in Paris on November 17–20. Medals were awarded in the disciplines of men's singles, ladies' singles, pair skating, and ice dancing. Skaters earned points toward qualifying for the 2011–12 Grand Prix Final.

Eligibility
Skaters who reached the age of 14 by July 1, 2011 were eligible to compete on the senior Grand Prix circuit.

In July 2011, minimum score requirements were added to the Grand Prix series and were set at two-thirds of the top scores at the 2011 World Championships. Prior to competing in a Grand Prix event, skaters were required to earn the following:

Entries
The entries were as follows. Brian Joubert withdrew due to injury and was replaced by Romain Ponsart.

Schedule
(Local time, GMT +01:00):

 Thursday, November 17
 09:30–16:15 – Official practices
 Friday, November 18
 09:00–14:10 – Official practices
 15:00–16:20 – Men's short
 16:45–17:55 – Pairs' short
 18:15–19:40 – Ladies' short
 20:00–21:10 – Short dance
 Saturday, November 19
 07:50–13:00 – Official practices
 13:30–15:05 – Men's free
 15:30–16:40 – Pairs' free
 16:40–17:00 – Medal ceremonies
 18:30–20:00 – Ladies' free
 20:30–21:45 – Free dance
 21:45–22:00 – Medal ceremonies
 Sunday, November 20
 10:00–12:00 – Official practices
 14:00–17:00 – Gala/Exhibitions

Results

Men

Ladies

Pairs

Ice dancing

References

External links

 
 ISU website: Entries

Trophée Éric Bompard, 2011
Internationaux de France
Trophée Éric Bompard
Figure
International figure skating competitions hosted by France
November 2011 sports events in France